Vilen Prokofyev (Kazakh: Вилен Прокофьев) (April 22, 2001 – February 3, 2020) was a Kazakh ice hockey player and goaltender for Snezhnye Barsy Astana from 2017 to 2020. He died of Ewing's sarcoma, aged 18.

Death 
The first symptoms that Prokofyev was diseased started appearing in May 2019, when he began having problems with his hip. He was diagnosed with Ewing's sarcoma soon after. He underwent specialized treatment in Moscow, with KHL clubs organizing charities and events to wish for his good health and fund his treatments. Prokofyev died on February 3, 2020, in Moscow, Russia at the age of 18.

References 

2001 births
2020 deaths
People from Karaganda Region
Kazakhstani ice hockey goaltenders
Snezhnye Barsy players
Deaths from cancer in Russia